61th edition of the tournament. Kuwait SC are the defending champions.

Main league table
The main league, consisting of 10 teams in which the top six clubs competing in the league and the last four clubs qualifying for the relegation group are determined.

Championship play-offs

Relegation-offs

References

External links
 
Kuwait League Fixtures and Results at FIFA
 

Kuwait Premier League seasons
Premier League
Kuwaiti Premier League